The Monroe Courts Historic District is a national historic district located at Arlington County, Virginia.  It contains 39 contributing buildings in a residential neighborhood in northern Arlington. They were built in 1938, and consist of four groups of  two-story, two-bay, rowhouse dwellings in a vernacular Colonial Revival-style.  They were built for a middle-class clientele in a fast-growing commuter suburb of Washington, D.C.

It was listed on the National Register of Historic Places in 2004.

References

Residential buildings on the National Register of Historic Places in Virginia
Colonial Revival architecture in Virginia
Historic districts in Arlington County, Virginia
National Register of Historic Places in Arlington County, Virginia
Historic districts on the National Register of Historic Places in Virginia